The Mechanic is a 1972 American action thriller film directed by Michael Winner from a screenplay by Lewis John Carlino. It stars Charles Bronson, in his first collaboration with Winner, Jan-Michael Vincent, Keenan Wynn, and Jill Ireland.

The story follows Arthur Bishop (Bronson), a top assassin who takes under his wing Steve McKenna (Vincent), the ruthless and ambitious son of Harry McKenna (Wynn), the former head of the secret organization for which Bishop works. It is noted for its opening, which features no dialogue for the first 16 minutes, as Bronson's character prepares to kill his current target. The title refers to a euphemism for hitmen.

Upon its release, the film received generally mixed reviews from critics but it was praised for its action scenes, acting and writing, although Winner's direction and the storytelling was criticized. A remake of the same name was released in 2011, starring Jason Statham as Bishop and Ben Foster as McKenna. The film was a financial success, and spawned a sequel, Mechanic: Resurrection, which was released in 2016.

Plot
Arthur Bishop is a top contract killer, known as a "mechanic", who works exclusively for a secretive international criminal organization that has very strict rules. His occupation affords him a lavish lifestyle - he regularly listens to classical music, has an art collection, and is a connoisseur of fine wines. However, he is forced to live alone - he cannot show emotions or trust people. Bishop is under constant emotional pressure, so much so that he is prescribed anti-depressants for depression.  One day he is temporarily hospitalized after he loses consciousness due to the stress. Bishop pays a call girl to have a simulated romantic social and sexual relationship, including her writing fake love letters to him.

When Bishop is assigned one of the organization's heads, "Big Harry" McKenna, he shoots at Big Harry while making him think that the shots are being fired by a hidden sniper. Harry, who Bishop knows has a weak heart, runs up a steep incline, which triggers a heart attack. Bishop then finishes Harry off by smothering him.

At Big Harry's funeral, Bishop runs into Harry's narcissistic, ruthless and ambitious son Steve. Steve is intrigued by Bishop and seeks to find out more about him. Bishop is also intrigued.  He realizes that Steve has a personality suited for being a hit man, and plays along. As part of his training, Bishop teaches Steve that "every person has a weakness, and that once this weakness is found, the target is easy to kill."  However, Bishop failed to get his superiors' prior consent for the arrangement. Following a messy assassination conducted by Bishop and Steve, the organization warns Bishop that his irresponsible choice to involve Steve has been interpreted as selfish behavior.

The organization then gives Bishop an urgent mission, this time in Italy. Once again, Bishop involves Steve in the new plan, but just before they leave Bishop happens to find among Steve's belongings a file containing information about Bishop. This file is very similar to the files Bishop prepared for his targets. Nevertheless, Bishop allows Steve to go with him to Italy.

In Italy, Bishop and Steve approach a boat where their intended victim is supposed to be, but it becomes apparent that this was a trap and they are the real targets. Bishop and Steve are ambushed, but they manage to kill all their would-be assassins.

His apprenticeship apparently complete, Steve shares a celebratory bottle of wine with Bishop, having coated the latter's glass with brucine, a colorless and deadly alkaloid. When Bishop realizes that he has been poisoned, he asks Steve if it was because Bishop had killed Steve's father. Steve responds that he had not realized his father was murdered. Steve taunts Bishop, saying "You said every man has his jelly spot. Yours was you just couldn't cut it alone." Steve goes on to reveal that he was not acting on orders to kill Bishop.

Steve returns to Bishop's home to pick up the Ford Mustang he had left there. He finds a note affixed to the rear-view mirror, which reads: "Steve, if you read this it means I didn't make it back. It also means you've broken a filament controlling a 13-second delay trigger. End of game. Bang! You're dead." As Steve frantically reaches for the door handle, the car explodes, killing him.

Cast

Production

Development
The film was based on an original story by Lewis John Carlino. He said he came up with the idea while researching his script for The Brotherhood (1968). Producer Ted Dubin, a New York entrepreneur, put up some development money so that Carlino could write it. Carlino called it, "a sort of existential statement on the licence to kill and what is occurring in our society, how legalized murder is occurring through our institutions."

Carlino formed a partnership with Dubin and producer Martin Poll. In February 1969 Carlino announced he had written two films that would be made by producer Martin Poll the following year: The Catalyst, about a wealthy man whose search for meaning leads him to start a revolution in Africa, and The Mechanic. He said The Mechanic was about "professionals who dispassionately murder people by contract" and was "a look at the nature of violence and counter-violence in our society." In April 1969 it was announced Cliff Robertson would star with Ted Dubin to produce alongside Poll for Universal.

Filming was delayed. Eventually the film was sold to Chartoff-Winkler who had a deal with United Artists. Carlino was paid $100,000 plus one-third of 50% of the profits.

Monte Hellman was scheduled to direct The Mechanic. He and screenwriter Lewis John Carlino worked on the script for several weeks before producers switched studios and hired Michael Winner to direct.

In Carlino's original script, the relationship between Arthur Bishop and Steve McKenna was explicitly gay. Producers had difficulty securing financing and several actors, including George C. Scott, flatly refused to consider the script until the homosexuality was removed. Carlino described The Mechanic as "one of the great disappointments of my life", continuing:

In November 1971 it was announced Charles Bronson would star under the direction of Michael Winner for producers Chartoff and Winkler. Filming was to begin December 6, 1971. Jan Michael Vincent's casting was announced early December 1971.

Filming
Filming took place in Los Angeles and in Italy.

The film's martial arts scenes were shot in one day at the dojo of Takayuki Kubota who also appears in the film. The shooting required 65 camera setups. The scenes were cut short in the final edit, because, according to associate producer Henry Gellis, their inclusion made the film seem like an installment in the James Bond series.

"It's pretty violent," said Vincent. "Bronson is totally nonverbal. So I can't say that much about him."

Music
The score and source music, by Jerry Fielding, were recorded at CTS (Cine-Tele Sound) Studios in London, England, between August 7 and 11, 1972. The orchestrations were by Lennie Niehaus And Greg McRitchie. The Recording Engineer was Dick Lewzey.

The source music consists of pieces composed by Ludwig van Beethoven — String Quartet, Opus 18, No 6 and Grosse Fuge: Opus 133 — as well as Eduardo di Capua's famous Neapolitan song ’O sole mio.

Release

Home media
Screen Archives Entertainment has released The Mechanic for the first time on Blu-ray on June 10, 2014.

Reception

Critical response
Vincent Canby of The New York Times described The Mechanic as a "solemn, rather spurious action melodrama". Noting the "father son rivalry" between Arthur and Steve and picking up on the "latent homosexual bond" between the two, Canby concluded that the film was "non-stop, mostly irrelevant physical spectacle" and pondered what a different director might have done with the same material. A review in Variety called it an "action-drenched gangster yarn which has all the makings of a heavy b.o. grosser, but simultaneously is burdened with an overly-contrived plot development." Roger Ebert gave the film 2.5 stars out of 4 and praised Bronson's performance, noting that he appears to be truly listening to Vincent rather than simply waiting for him to stop for Bronson's next line. While finding the plot twists "neat", Ebert found that director Winner failed to squarely address the relationship between the leads in favor of too many boring action sequences. Gene Siskel of the Chicago Tribune gave the film only 1 star out of 4 and wrote, "The entirely unoriginal production moves at a numbing pace with Bronson mirroring the directorial lethargy with his silent, 'don't I have strong cheekbones' demeanor." Kevin Thomas of the Los Angeles Times praised the film as "A hard-edged, brutal yet absorbing contemporary gangster movie" with "top-notch" performances. Judith Crist dismissed the film as "a banal expedition into slaughter and sadism and stupid dialogue". Any hint of authenticity, she wrote, was obliterated by Winner's "bang-bang-bang approach". Gary Arnold of The Washington Post wrote, "It's a predictable, expendable piece of formula moviemaking, and the men responsible for it seem considerably more proficient at manufacturing thrills than generating and sustaining dramatic interest."

Other media

Novelization
A novelization credited to screenwriter Lewis John Carlino was published by Signet Books to accompany the film's release.

Remake

On May 7, 2009, it was announced that director Simon West would be helming a remake with Jason Statham taking the lead role.  The remake opened in the United States on January 28, 2011, making $11,500,000 on its opening weekend. A sequel was released in August 2016.

See also

 List of American films of 1972

Notes

La-La Land Records Album, LLLCD1191, released 2012.

References

Russo, Vito (1987). The Celluloid Closet: Homosexuality in the Movies (rev. ed). New York: Harper & Row. .
Stevens, Brad (2003). Monte Hellman: His Life and Films. McFarland. .

External links

1972 films
1970s action thriller films
1970s crime thriller films
American action thriller films
American adventure thriller films
American crime thriller films
1970s English-language films
Films about contract killing
Films about friendship
Films directed by Michael Winner
Films scored by Jerry Fielding
United Artists films
Films set in California
Films set in Naples
Films produced by Robert Chartoff
Films produced by Irwin Winkler
Films with screenplays by Lewis John Carlino
The Mechanic films
1970s American films